For information on all College of Charleston sports, see College of Charleston Cougars

The Charleston Cougars baseball team is a varsity intercollegiate athletic team of the College of Charleston in Charleston, South Carolina, United States. The team is a member of the Colonial Athletic Association, which is part of the National Collegiate Athletic Association's Division I. The team plays its home games at CofC Baseball Stadium at Patriot's Point in Mount Pleasant, South Carolina. The Cougars are currently coached by Chad Holbrook, who was previously the head coach at the University of South Carolina.

History
The College of Charleston baseball team has been a member of NCAA Division I since 1991. The Cougars have won six regular season conference titles and two conference tournament championships, one in the Southern Conference (2006) and one in the Colonial Athletic Association (2014). The Cougars have appeared in the NCAA Division I Baseball Tournament seven times, most recently in 2015. They have advanced to the Super Regional round of the NCAA Tournament twice (2006, 2014), accounting for their deepest postseason run. The Cougars swept the 2006 Lexington Regional and the 2014 Gainesville Regional, before falling to Georgia Tech and Texas Tech, respectively.

From 2009 until 2015, the Cougars were coached by Monte Lee, a former player for Charleston. During Lee's tenure at CofC, the Cougars went 276–145, qualifying for the NCAA Tournament in four of Lee's six seasons. Lee coached three players that were drafted in the first five rounds in the MLB Draft: Taylor Clarke (3rd RD, 2015), Carl Wise (4th RD, 2015) and Heath Hembree (5th RD, 2010), who reached the MLB in 2013. Lee left Charleston after the 2015 season to take the same position with the Clemson Tigers.

In 2017, Chad Holbrook was hired on as head coach after a four year stint with South Carolina. Chad was previously recruiter of the year and assistant coach of the year as an assistant coach with South Carolina lead the Gamecocks to the NCAA Super Regionals twice during his tenure as head coach. In 2022, the Cougars were the CAA regular season champions for the first time since 2015.

Charleston has produced 28 college All-Americans and 62 professional players, including Brett Gardner of the New York Yankees. From 2004 to 2015, the College of Charleston has the 13th best winning percentage in all of Division I baseball.  Oliver Marmol, the current manager of the St. Louis Cardinals, is a former Cougar baseball player.

Year-by-year results
Charleston's history since joining Division I in 1991.

NCAA tournament results
Charleston has appeared in the NCAA Division I Baseball Championship seven times, most recently in 2015 when the Cougars lost in the Tallahassee Regional final to Florida State. Charleston's overall record in the NCAA Tournament is 14–14.

(Bold indicates furthest advancement.)

Major League Baseball
The College of Charleston has had 60 Major League Baseball Draft selections since the draft began in 1965. In 2015, pitcher Taylor Clarke eclipsed outfielder Brett Gardner as the highest Charleston player ever drafted, as Clarke was the first pick of the third round (76th overall) which bested Gardner's 109th overall selection in the third round of 2005.

See also
List of NCAA Division I baseball programs

References

External links